Timothy J. Carroll (8 July 1888 – 25 May 1955) was an Irish track and field athlete who competed for the United Kingdom of Great Britain and Ireland in the 1912 Summer Olympics and in the 1920 Summer Olympics. He was born in Cork.

In 1912 he finished ninth in the high jump competition. He also participated in the triple jump event and finished 19th. Eight years later he finished ninth again in the high jump competition of the 1920 Olympics.

References

External links
Timothy Carroll. Sports Reference. Retrieved on 2015-02-11.
List of Irish athletes

1888 births
1955 deaths
Sportspeople from Cork (city)
Irish male high jumpers
British male high jumpers
British male triple jumpers
Olympic athletes of Great Britain
Athletes (track and field) at the 1912 Summer Olympics
Athletes (track and field) at the 1920 Summer Olympics
Irish male triple jumpers